Reata Pharmaceuticals, Inc. is a pharmaceutical company based in Plano, Texas. Founded in 2002, Reata is primarily focused on investigating experimental oral antioxidative and anti-inflammatory drugs, which dually activate the antioxidative transcription factor Nrf2 and inhibit the pro-inflammatory transcription factor NF-κB.

Pipeline 
The antioxidative and anti-inflammatory compounds bardoxolone methyl and RTA 408 are the lead clinical development compounds in Reata’s portfolio.

Bardoxolone Methyl 
Bardoxolone methyl was one of the first of the class of synthetic triterpenoids to be studied in the clinic.  It has been evaluated in Phase 1 studies for cancer, Phase 2 and 3 studies for chronic kidney disease (CKD) associated with type 2 diabetes, and is currently being evaluated in a Phase 2 study for pulmonary arterial hypertension.

RTA 408 
Omaveloxolone (RTA 408) is a second generation member of the synthetic oleanane triterpenoid compounds and currently in clinical development.  Preclinical studies have demonstrated that RTA 408 possesses antioxidative and anti-inflammatory activities, as well as the potential to improve mitochondrial bioenergetics.  Because of the broad applicability of such effects across many diseases, RTA 408 is currently under clinical investigation in several Phase 2 clinical studies including immunooncology, corneal endothelial cell loss associated with cataract surgery Friedreich’s ataxia, and mitochondrial myopathies.

Others 
Reata is also actively engaged in the discovery of small molecule disease-modifying drugs that function by stabilizing the normal three-dimensional structure of target proteins or generally enhancing the folding environment of the cell. Defects in protein folding underlie a large number of genetic diseases including certain forms of cancer, familial Alzheimer's disease, and cystic fibrosis. Protein folding defects are also believed to play important roles in the development of non-inherited forms of many of these diseases.

Partnerships 
Reata has a licensing agreement with Kyowa Hakko Kirin for development and commercialization of bardoxolone methyl for CKD and related indications in Japan, China, Taiwan, Korea, and other select Southeast Asian countries.

Reata also has a licensing agreement with Abbvie for development and commercialization of bardoxolone methyl outside the U.S., excluding Asian markets defined in the agreement with Kyowa Hakko Kirin. Abbvie and Reata also have a second agreement for development of the second generation portfolio of synthetic oleanane triterpenoid compounds, including RTA 408, as well as other Nrf2 activators.

References

External links
 

Pharmaceutical companies of the United States
Pharmaceutical companies established in 2002
Companies based in Plano, Texas
Health care companies based in Texas
Companies listed on the Nasdaq
2016 initial public offerings